Warren Parr (born 25 January 1952) is an Australian former hurdler. He competed in the men's 110 metres hurdles at the 1976 Summer Olympics.

References

External links
 

1952 births
Living people
Athletes (track and field) at the 1976 Summer Olympics
Athletes (track and field) at the 1974 British Commonwealth Games
Athletes (track and field) at the 1978 Commonwealth Games
Australian male hurdlers
Olympic athletes of Australia
Place of birth missing (living people)
Commonwealth Games medallists in athletics
Commonwealth Games bronze medallists for Australia
20th-century Australian people
21st-century Australian people
Medallists at the 1978 Commonwealth Games